The Burma Trade Union Congress was a central trade union organization in Burma. The BTUC was founded in December 1950 as the trade union wing of the Burma Workers and Peasants Party. BTUC was formed after a split away from the Trade Union Congress (Burma) (TUC(B)). Thakin Lwin, former Minister of Labour (1948-1949), served as the president of BTUC. BTUC was affiliated to the World Federation of Trade Unions.

BTUC held its first congress in Rangoon February 9-12, 1951.

References

Trade unions in Myanmar
Myanmar
Trade unions established in 1950
World Federation of Trade Unions